Sangaris trifasciata is a species of beetle in the family Cerambycidae. It was described by Melzer in 1928. It is known from Brazil.

References

trifasciata
Beetles described in 1928